The Sykes-Leigh House, also known as Rosewood Manor is a historic mansion in Columbus, Mississippi, U.S.. It was built in 1838 for Richard Sykes, a planter. It has been listed on the National Register of Historic Places since March 14, 1985.

References

Houses on the National Register of Historic Places in Mississippi
Greek Revival houses in Mississippi
Houses completed in 1838
National Register of Historic Places in Lowndes County, Mississippi
Antebellum architecture